Jamestown Public Schools (JPS), also known as the Jamestown City School District, is a school district headquartered in Jamestown, New York.

 it has about 5,100 students.

History

Dr. Bret Apthorpe serves as the superintendent. In February 2020 he announced that he would retire at the end of the school year, so the district board of education began a superintendent search. At the same time four school principals announced that they too were retiring.

Schools
 High school
 Jamestown High School
 Middle schools
 Jefferson Middle School
 Persell Middle School
 Washington Middle School
 Elementary schools
 Bush Elementary School
 Fletcher Elementary School
 Lincoln Elementary School
 Love Elementary School
 Ring Elementary School
 Other
 Tech Academy

References

External links
 Jamestown City School District
School districts in New York (state)
Education in Chautauqua County, New York
Jamestown, New York